This is a list of types of spoons used for eating, cooking, and serving:

Eating utensils
Spoons are primarily used to transfer edibles from vessel to mouth, usually at a dining table. A spoon's style is usually named after a food or drink with which they are most often used, the material with which they are composed, or a feature of their appearance or structure.

 Bouillon spoon — round-bowled, somewhat smaller than a soup spoon
 Caviar spoon — usually made of mother of pearl, gold, animal horn, or wood, but not silver, which would affect the taste
 Chinese spoon — a type of soup spoon with a short, thick handle extending directly from a deep, flat bowl.
 Coffee spoon — small, for use with after-dinner coffee cups, (usually smaller than teaspoon)
 Cutty — short, chiefly Scot and Irish
 Demitasse spoon — diminutive, smaller than a coffee spoon; for traditional coffee drinks in specialty cups and for spooning cappuccino froth
 Dessert spoon — intermediate in size between a teaspoon and a tablespoon, used in eating dessert and sometimes soup or cereals
 Egg spoon — for eating soft boiled eggs; with a shorter handle and bowl than a teaspoon, and a bowl broadly round across the end, rather than pointed, intended to enable the user to scrape soft-boiled egg out of the shell
 French sauce spoon — for eating sauce; similar to a dessert spoon, but with a flatter, notched bowl
 Grapefruit spoon or orange spoon — tapers to a sharp point or teeth, used for citrus fruits and melons
 Gumbo or Chowder spoon — larger round bowl, approximately 7"
 Horn spoon — a spoon made of horn, used chiefly interjectionally in the phrase By the Great Horn Spoon!, as in the children's novel of that title by Sid Fleischman. Horn spoons are still used for eating boiled eggs because they do not tarnish (like silver) from the sulfurous yolk. Horn, and mother of pearl, are used for caviar, because a silver spoon would unpleasantly affect the taste of the delicate roe.
 Iced tea spoon or parfait spoon — with a bowl similar in size and shape to that of a teaspoon, and with a long slim handle, used in stirring tall drinks, or eating parfait, sundaes, sorbets, or similar foods served in tall glasses
 Korean spoon — long-handled, often with shallow point at end of bowl
 Marrow spoon or marrow scoop — 18th century, often of silver, with a long thin bowl suitable for removing marrow from a bone
 Melon spoon — often silver, used for eating melon
 Plastic spoon — cheap, disposable, flexible, stain resistant, sometimes biodegradable; black, white, colored, or clear; smooth, non-porous surface; varied types and uses
 Rattail spoon — developed in the later 17th century; with a thin pointed tongue on the bottom of the bowl to reinforce the joint of bowl and handle
 Salt spoon — miniature, used with an open salt cellar for individual service
 Saucier spoon — slightly flattened spoon with a notch in one side; used for drizzling sauces over fish or other delicate foods.
 Soup spoon — with a large or rounded bowl for eating soup.
 Cream-soup spoon — round-bowled, slightly shorter than a standard soup spoon
 Teaspoon — small, suitable for stirring and sipping tea or coffee; standard capacity one third of a tablespoon; a cooking measure of volume
 Tablespoon — sometimes used for ice cream and soup; standard capacity of three teaspoons; a cooking measure of volume
 M1926 spoon — Army issue with mess kits from 1941 to 2002, volume of two tablespoons
 Seal-top spoon — silver, end of handle in the form of a circular seal; popular in England in the later 16th and 17th centuries
 Spork, sporf, spife, splayd, etc. — differing combinations of a spoon with a fork or knife
 Stroon — a straw with a spoon on the end for eating slushies, etc.

Cooking and serving utensils
Spoons primarily used in food preparation, handling, or serving, in the kitchen or at the table. Most are named after an edible for which they are specially designed. Two utensils with spoon-shaped ends are also included.

 Absinthe spoon — perforated or slotted to dissolve a sugar cube in a glass of absinthe; normally flat bowl, with a notch in the handle where it rests on the rim of a glass
 Bar spoon — equivalent to a teaspoon, used in measuring ingredients for mixed drinks
 Berry spoon — large, with a broad deep bowl; used in serving berries, salad, and other juicy foods
 Bonbon spoon — with a flat perforated bowl for bonbons and nuts
 Caddy spoon — used for measuring tea leaves; traditionally made of silver
 Chutney spoon — for hygienically dispensing chutneys, especially mango chutney, from a communal open or lidded dish; the two are usually manufactured together as part of a multi-purpose dispenser in restaurants; alternatively may come with a specially designed and matching chutney spoon holder for domestic use

 Honey spoon — for taking some honey from a pot or jar 
 Jelly or Jam spoon — for serving fruit preserves; sometimes with a point and an odd-shaped edge; sometimes used with a jelly jar
 Ladle — with a deep bowl and a long handle attached at a steep angle, to scoop and convey liquids

 Mote spoon — perforated, used to sieve loose tea from a cup; handle finial has a spike to unclog the teapot spout
 Mustard spoon — for serving mustard; usually small, with a deep bowl elongated to form a scoop and set at right angles to the handle
 Olive spoon — used to remove olives from their liquid, while allowing the liquid to drain easily from the spoon; typically made from stainless steel; has slots or a hole cut from the bottom of a bowl-shaped head to release the liquid from the spoon; also used to lift cherries, cocktail onions, pickled garlic and similar condiments from the liquids used to store the foods
Panja — serving spoon for rice used in India, with four finger-shaped indentations and a flat surface. Typically also has a hole at the end where a loop or string is tied to enable easy storage.
 Rice spoon — for serving rice (known in Japan as a shamoji)
 Salt spoon — miniature, used with an open salt cellar for individual service
 Serving spoon — serves and portions salads, vegetables, and fruits; larger than a tablespoon; bowl round rather than oval, to take up food more easily; long handle
 Slotted spoon — used in food preparation; has slots, holes, or other openings in the bowl which let liquid pass through while preserving the larger solids on top
 Spaghetti spoons have large tines for ladling cooked spaghetti and sometimes a hole in the middle to measure uncooked spaghetti.
 Straw spoon—the curved spoon end of a straw, typically used for eating the remains of ice-blended drinks
 Stirrer — utensil with a long stem and usually a spoon end for mixing drinks
 Sugar spoon or sugar shell — for serving granulated sugar; bowl often molded in the form of a sea shell
 Tablespoon — large, usually used for serving (UK); main kind of spoon used for eating (US)
 Wooden spoon — made of wood, commonly used in food preparation
 Ice-cream spoon — it is used to scoop ice cream into round shape.

Other objects
Items in the form of spoons used for ceremonial or commemorative purposes, or for functions other than ingesting comestibles.

 Anointing spoon or coronation spoon — a silver spoon, part of the  Crown Jewels of the United Kingdom, the  regalia used for the coronation of English monarchs; first used in the 12th century
 Apostle spoon — a christening gift with the bust of an apostle as the finial
 Cocaine spoon or coke spoon — a very small spoon used to sniff cocaine
 Cochlear — spoon used in the Eastern Orthodox Church in serving the consecrated wine, sometimes with a particle of the sacramental bread
 Ear spoon — a small spoon used to remove earwax, more common before the marketing of cotton-tipped swabs for this purpose
 Lovespoon — a wooden spoon, often with double bowl, formerly carved by a Welsh suitor as a gift of betrothal for his promised bride
 Maidenhead spoon — 16th century silver or silver-gilt spoon with handle terminating in a bust of the Virgin Mary
 Silver spoon — a small spoon given to a newborn child to ensure good fortune; used as a metaphor for someone born to riches
 Snuff spoon – a small spoon used to take snuff, used to avoid staining the fingers with powder. These spoons are so small that they are frequently mistaken for the toy ones. The designs of the snuff spoons closely followed that of the larger ones, and thus can be used to date the étuis containing them 
 Souvenir spoon— decorative, used to commemorate a place or event
 Uddharani — a small gold, silver, copper, or brass spoon used for Achamana and offering water during Hindu prayers (puja)
 Wooden spoon — a spoon made of wood presented originally at Cambridge University to the man ranking lowest among those taking honors in the Mathematical Tripos, and at other colleges and universities to other selected recipients
 Water Dipper — a spoon with a very big bowl, used for scooping water to take a bath 
 Siwur — a dipper made of coconut shell that is usually used for bathing. It is the main component to perform the jailangkung ritual

References

Sources 
 

Spoons
Spoons
Alphabetic lists